Tyrosine-protein kinase 6 is an enzyme that in humans is encoded by the PTK6 gene.

Function 

Tyrosine-protein kinase 6—also known as BRK (breast tumor kinase)—is a cytoplasmic non-receptor protein kinase which may function as an intracellular signal transducer in epithelial tissues. The encoded protein has been shown to undergo autophosphorylation.

Clinical significance 

Overexpression of this gene in mammary epithelial cells leads to sensitization of the cells to epidermal growth factor and results in a partially transformed phenotype.  Expression of this gene has been detected at low levels in some breast tumors but not in normal breast tissue.

Interactions
PTK6 has been shown to interact with STAP2 and KHDRBS1.

References

Further reading

Tyrosine kinases